This is a List of aircraft units of the Royal Navy.

Communications flights

Ferry flights

Ferry pools

Ferry squadrons

Other flights
 RN Night Fighter Flight -> RN Fighter Flight
 Test Flight, Trincomalee

Station flights
 RNAS Abbotsinch
 Stinson Reliant I, Supermarine Sea Otter, de Havilland Dominie, Hawker Sea Hawk FB.3, Fairey Gannet T.2 & T.5, de Havilland Sea Vampire T.22 & Boulton Paul Sea Balliol T.21
 RNAS Anthorn
 Airspeed Oxford, Beech Traveller I, Fairey Swordfish II, Supermarine Seafire III & F.17, de Havilland Tiger Moth II, Avro Anson I, North American Harvard IIa, de Havilland Dominie, Westland Dragonfly HR.3, Fairey Firefly FR.5 & T.2, Fairey Gannet T.2, Hawker Sea Hawk F.1 & de Havilland Sea Venom FAW.20

See also
 List of aircraft wings of the Royal Navy
 List of Fleet Air Arm aircraft squadrons
 List of Fleet Air Arm groups

References

Citations

Bibliography

Aircraft units